Pratt & Whitney Stadium at Rentschler Field is a stadium in East Hartford, Connecticut. It is primarily used for football and soccer, and is the home field of the University of Connecticut (UConn) Huskies. In 2010, it was home to the Hartford Colonials of the United Football League. The stadium, which opened in 2003, was the first stadium used primarily by an NCAA Division I-A (now FBS) team to open in the 21st century. The permanent stadium capacity is 40,000, consisting of 38,066 permanent seats with a standing-room area in the scoreboard plaza that can accommodate up to 1,934 people. It also has a game day capability to add approximately 2,000 temporary seats as it did for UConn
football vs. Michigan in 2013. Connecticut played on campus at Memorial Stadium in Storrs, before 2003.

Rentschler Field was originally the name of the company airfield for Pratt & Whitney that formerly occupied the site. The airfield, which began operations in 1931, was named after Frederick Rentschler, who founded Pratt & Whitney in 1925 and also founded its parent company, United Technologies. It was originally used for test flights and maintenance operations, and later for corporate aviation. The  site was decommissioned as an airport in the 1990s, and donated to the state of Connecticut by United Technologies in 1999. A subsequent 65-acre donation by United Technologies in 2009 allowed for the construction of additional grass parking lots adjacent to the Stadium.

Pursuant to a lease agreement with the State, UConn plays all its home football games at Rentschler Field.

History
The New England Patriots considered moving to Connecticut and sharing a stadium with the UConn football team in the mid-1990s. The new stadium was supposed to be built on the Connecticut Convention Center site in downtown Hartford.  However, when the Patriots completed the deal for Gillette Stadium in Foxboro, Massachusetts, the Hartford stadium plan was scaled down and the location was moved to East Hartford. The current capacity of 40,000 can expand to 50,000 with limited rehabilitation and has the layout and design for expansion of up to 60,000 seats in the future.

The stadium is owned by the State of Connecticut, Office of Policy and Management, while operations are overseen by the quasi-public Capital Region Development Authority (CRDA). Global Spectrum, L.P. has managed the building on behalf of CRDA since 2013. Previously, the Stadium was managed by Bushnell Management Services (2011-2013), Anschutz Entertainment Group (AEG)(2007-2011) and Madison Square Garden L.P. (2003-2007).

Prior to the 2013 season, a new 28 feet high by 73 feet wide and a 15HD pixel video display was installed replacing the stadiums original scoreboard.

On July 16, 2015, it was announced that the stadium had been named Pratt & Whitney Stadium in a deal between Pratt & Whitney and UConn. The playing surface is still named Rentschler Field. In return, Pratt and Whitney donated additional land that will be used for game day parking.

Connecticut Huskies
The UConn Huskies football team has an all time 67–54 record at Rentschler Field.

Sellouts

Soccer

Hartford Athletic
On March 11, 2019, it was announced that the renovations at Dillon Stadium would not be completed on time for Hartford Athletic's home opener on May 4 against Charlotte Independence. Hartford Athletic played seven games at Pratt & Whitney Stadium.

Major League Soccer

On September 23, 2017, New York City FC played a home match at Pratt & Whitney Stadium, against the Houston Dynamo, in the stadium's first Major League Soccer game. The game was relocated from Yankee Stadium in New York City due to a schedule conflict with the New York Yankees.

On September 11, 2020, Governor Ned Lamont announced that Toronto FC would finish their season's home matches at Pratt & Whitney Stadium due to travel restrictions during the COVID-19 pandemic.

United States men's national soccer team
Rentschler Field has hosted several United States men's national soccer team's home games, including Landon Donovan's last game for the National Team on October 10, 2014.

United States women's national soccer team
Rentschler Field has also hosted several United States women's national soccer team's home games.

Other soccer matches

Hartford Colonials
The Hartford Colonials were a United Football League team that played their home games at Rentschler Field. During their (2010 UFL season), the Colonials played all four home games at Rentschler, after having played one there the previous season while they were known as the New York Sentinels. Attendance at Colonials games averaged a consistent 15,000 people, third place in the five-team league behind Omaha and Sacramento. The UFL suspended the Colonials franchise in 2011 and the franchise was officially terminated when the team's former owner (Bill Mayer) was named as the new owner of the Virginia Destroyers.

Lacrosse
On May 19, 2019, Rentschler Field hosted the Quarterfinals for the 2019 NCAA Men's Lacrosse Championship.
In 2021 and 2022, Rentschler Field will host the NCAA Men's Lacrosse Championship for Divisions I, II, and III.

Rugby union
On June 4, 2005, Rentschler Field hosted two rugby union matches; Wales vs USA Rugby and the 2005 U.S. Rugby Super League Championship game, between New York Athletic Club Rugby Football Club and Belmont Shore RFC in front of 8,027. Wales would defeat the US 77–3 and NYAC would defeat Belmont Shore 23–19. In 2008 Rentschler Field hosted a match between Irish provincial side Munster and the USA Eagles, with Munster winning 46–22.

Whalers Hockey Fest
On August 24, 2010, a fan event, called Whalers Fan Fest, occurred, featuring many of the former players, draws were close to 5,000 people on a Saturday afternoon.

From February 11 to the 20th, 2011, the stadium hosted the Whalers Hockey Fest 2011. A hockey rink was constructed on the field much like is done for the annual NHL Winter Classic. Events included a Hartford Whalers Alumni vs. Boston Bruins Alumni game, with an appearance from the Hanson Brothers, from the film Slap Shot, a double-header featuring both UConn men's and women's hockey teams, a Hockey Legends team faced off against the Mystery, Alaska Hollywood team, along with the Hanson Brothers from the movie Slap Shot, and the second edition of the American Hockey League Outdoor Classic between the host Connecticut Whale and the Providence Bruins. Over 15,000 fans came out to watch the so-called "Whale Bowl", while over 1,700 attended the UConn men's game.

Concerts

Gallery

See also
 List of NCAA Division I FBS football stadiums

References

External links

 
 Profile from official UConn athletics site (archived)

College football venues
American football venues in Connecticut
Sports venues in Hartford County, Connecticut
UConn Huskies football venues
Soccer venues in Connecticut
Hartford Athletic
USL Championship stadiums
Major League Soccer stadiums
Toronto FC
Rugby union stadiums in the United States
Rugby union stadiums in Connecticut
United Football League (2009–2012) venues
New York Sentinels stadiums
Hartford Colonials stadiums
CONCACAF Gold Cup stadiums
2003 establishments in Connecticut
Sports venues completed in 2003
Lacrosse venues in Connecticut
Buildings and structures in East Hartford, Connecticut
Music venues in Connecticut